Spring Lake Park School District 16 is a Minnesota school district serving 5,500 students from the cities of Blaine, Spring Lake Park, and Fridley. Schools and programs include Spring Lake Park High School, Westwood Middle School, Westwood Intermediate School, Northpoint Elementary, Park Terrace Elementary, Centerview Elementary, Woodcrest Elementary Spanish Immersion, The Lighthouse School, Spring Lake Park Online Learning, Early Childhood Center, and District Services Center.

Schools
 Centerview Elementary's current campus, with a capacity of 600, opened in 2018. It includes nanowalls which are transparent.

References

External links
Spring Lake Park Schools website

Education in Anoka County, Minnesota
School districts in Minnesota